The 2016 Men's U23 Pan-American Volleyball Cup was the third edition of the bi-annual men's volleyball tournament, played by nine countries from September 5–10, 2016 in Guanajuato City, Mexico.

Competing nations

Preliminary round
All times are in Central Standard Time (UTC−06:00)

Group A

Group B

Group C

Final round

Championship bracket

Classification 9

Quarterfinals

Semifinals

Seventh place match

Fifth place match

Bronze medal match

Final

Final standing

Individual awards

Most Valuable Player
 
Best Scorer
 
Best Setter
 
Best Opposite
 
Best Outside Hitters
 
 
Best Middle Blockers
 
 
Best Server
 
Best Digger
 
Best Receiver
 
Best Libero

References

Men's Pan-American Volleyball Cup
Pan-American
2016 in Mexican sports
International volleyball competitions hosted by Mexico